Muruhar is a Tamil community found in the Indian state  in some parts of Kerala and Southern Province .

Born 

 Word mukguhar came from  "Guhan" The Hunter King – The Controller Of The Banks Of Ganges With Thousands Of Boats.
 Mukguhar are the King people Who help Guhan The Hunter King according to Kamba ramayanam,
Guhan is known as Kevat in north India .
Kamban describes Guhan that he can see ( night vision – he had animal instincts ) in the night in the darkest and densest of jungles and can kill any wild animal faster than its reaction – is quicker than a leopard, has the power of the Lion, reflexes of a tiger and strength of an elephant with his sharp knife and swift that makes him a dangerous hunter but with the knowledge and compassion of a human.

Guhan 
Guha (Sanskrit: गुह), is another name of the Hindu deity Skanda or Muruga. Guhan means the resident of the "cave of the heart". This meaning is derived from the Hindu philosophy that the ultimate truth/reality (God) is ever present in the hearts of all living beings and is also the cause of the life force. Guhan is commonly associated with Lord Subrahmanya, one of the most revered deities of Tamil Hindus.

Guha is also encountered in one of the epic stories of Hindus. Guha, as proper noun, appears in "Ramayana" which is one of the two Hindu epics, as a boatsman. Guha assists Rama (reincarnation of Lord Vishnu) to cross the river during Rama's banishment from Ayodhya by his stepmother. Guha is revered for his high-standing honorable qualities and continues to be an inspiration to many practicing Hindus.

Guhan is not a common name and is usually given to children from Tamil Nadu, the southernmost state in India.

Another variation of the name that's common in Southern India is Guhesan (pronounced "Gu"-"hey"-"son"). In the Hindu mythology, it is believed that Skanda or Muruga is the son of Siva (aka Shiva, Easan) alone without mother Parvathi (the goddess) And so "Guha-Easan" means "The son of Easan". Which over time has become the current form Guhesan.

Literature 

Kambar (poet) :
Kambar (Kamban in casual address) (Tamil: கம்பர்) (c. 1180, Tiruvaluntur, Tanjore district, India – 1250)[1] was a medieval Tamil poet and the author of the Ramavataram, popularly known as Kambaramayanam, the Tamil version of Ramayana.[2] Kambar also authored other literary works in Tamil, such as Erezhupathu, Silaiezhupathu, Kangai Puranam, sadagopar anthathi, and Sarasvati Anthati.[2]

Kamba Ramayanam :
The original version of Ramayana was written by Valmiki. It is an epic of 24,000 verses which depicts the journey of Rama, a prince of Ayodhya who belonged to Raghuvamsa (Solar dynasty). In Hinduism, Rama is the seventh incarnation of Lord Vishnu, one of the Trimurti (the Hindu holy trinity which includes Brahma and Shiva).

The Ramavataram or Kamba Ramayanam of Kamban is an epic of about 11,000 stanzas, as opposed to Valmiki's 24000 couplets.[4] The Rama-avataram or Rama-kathai as it was originally called was accepted into the holy precincts in the presence of Vaishnava Acharya Nathamuni.[5]

Kamba Ramayana is not a verbal translation of the Sanskrit epic by Valmiki, but a retelling of the story of Lord Rama.[5]

Legend has it that the entire episode was written in one night by Lord Ganesh. Ganesha is said to have written the poems that Kambar dictated to him during the night, as Kambar procrastinated the work till the day before the deadline set by the King.

There is also a legend that Ottakuthar—an eminent Tamil poet and a contemporary of Kambar[6][7]—also composed Ramayanam. Tradition has it that Ottakoothar was ahead of Kambar as the former had already finished five cantos, but when the king asked for an update, Kambar—a master of words—lied that he was already working on the Setu Bandhalam, upon which Ottakoothar feeling dejected threw away all his work. Feeling guilty, Kambar recovered the last two chapters of Ottakoothar's composition and added into his own.[8]

Vedi Arasan 

Vediyarasan, the king of Nedunthivu ruling all islands and mannar (gulf) sea. His period not clearly defined. Someone quoting 'silapathikaram' said his period before 200 B.C. Vediyarasan means "king of firecrackers" may be the name derived using firecrackers to destroy enemy ships. Because of Pearl business flourishing in this region; he was in a position to guard very effectively .

Religion 
Most of the members of this community in India are Hindus.

Current condition 
The history of this people started with Guhan. At the time of colonization, Mukguhar ran warships to counter the arrival of settlers. Over time, this community has lost its leadership and installed in various regions within the country. some of them were integrated into other communities, losing their original identity (example : their basic religion Hindu or profession).

Others have maintained their identity through the cultivation of the land they own, the collection of pearls then transported to India temples (madurai), or to others, via the commander from merchant ship.

Actually, many of the Mukguhars do a variety of jobs, including engineering, education, clerical, etc., though major part of the community does cultivation related works. However, there are many entrepreneurs and educationists among them.
This should be considered as a normal happening in any dynamic working community. they are socially and economically placed in good positions from ancient times as they were mainly agriculturists or high ranking government officials.

References 

 "Kampan." Encyclopædia Britannica. Encyclopædia Britannica Online. Encyclopædia Britannica Inc., 2011. Web. 23 Dec. 2011.
http://tamilnation.co/literature/kamban/kambaramayanam.html
Nilakanta Sastri, K.A. (2000). A History of South India. New Delhi: Oxford University Press. .
"Kampan." Encyclopædia Britannica. Encyclopædia Britannica Online. Encyclopædia Britannica Inc., 2011. Web. 23 Dec. 2011.
The Cyclopaedia of India and of Eastern and Southern Asia By Edward Balfour
The Tamils and their culture, page 82
Tamil Literature, page 220

External links 
 https://web.archive.org/web/20140725202815/http://www.mukguhar.com/
 http://www.heritagewiki.org/index.php?title=Guhan_-_Part_1
 http://www.heritagewiki.org/index.php?title=Guhan_-_Part_2
 http://singai-empire.blogspot.fr
 http://panipulam.net/?p=47663

Indian Tamil people
Tamil-language literature
Social groups of Kerala